Feeding is the process by which organisms, typically animals, obtain food. Terminology often uses either the suffixes -vore, -vory, or -vorous from Latin vorare, meaning "to devour", or -phage, -phagy, or -phagous from Greek φαγεῖν, meaning "to eat".

Evolutionary history
The evolution of feeding is varied with some feeding strategies evolving several times in independent lineages. In terrestrial vertebrates, the earliest forms were large amphibious piscivores 400 million years ago. While amphibians continued to feed on fish and later insects, reptiles began exploring two new food types, other tetrapods (carnivory), and later, plants (herbivory). Carnivory was a natural transition from insectivory for medium and large tetrapods, requiring minimal adaptation (in contrast, a complex set of adaptations was necessary for feeding on highly fibrous plant materials).

Evolutionary adaptations

The specialization of organisms towards specific food sources is one of the major causes of evolution of form and function, such as:

 mouth parts and teeth, such as in whales, vampire bats, leeches, mosquitos, predatory animals such as felines and fishes, etc.
 distinct forms of beaks in birds, such as in hawks, woodpeckers, pelicans, hummingbirds, parrots, kingfishers, etc.
 specialized claws and other appendages, for apprehending or killing (including fingers in primates)
 changes in body colour for facilitating camouflage, disguise, setting up traps for preys, etc.
 changes in the digestive system, such as the system of stomachs of herbivores, commensalism and symbiosis

Classification

By mode of ingestion
There are many modes of feeding that animals exhibit, including:
Filter feeding: obtaining nutrients from particles suspended in water
Deposit feeding: obtaining nutrients from particles suspended in soil
Fluid feeding: obtaining nutrients by consuming other organisms' fluids
Bulk feeding: obtaining nutrients by eating all of an organism.
Ram feeding and suction feeding: ingesting prey via the fluids around it.

By mode of digestion
Extra-cellular digestion: excreting digesting enzymes and then reabsorbing the products
Myzocytosis: one cell pierces another using a feeding tube, and sucks out cytoplasm
Phagocytosis: engulfing food matter into living cells, where it is digested

By food type

Polyphagy is the ability of an animal to eat a variety of food, whereas monophagy is the intolerance of every food except of one specific type (see generalist and specialist species).

Another classification refers to the specific food animals specialize in eating, such as:
 Carnivore: the eating of animals
 Araneophagy: eating spiders
 Avivore: eating birds
 Corallivore: eating coral
 Durophagy: eating hard-shelled or exoskeleton bearing organisms
 Egg predator: eating eggs (but also see "Intrauterine cannibalism" below), also Ovivore
 Haematophage/Sanguivore: eating blood
 Insectivore: eating insects
 Myrmecophage: eating ants and/or termites
 Invertivore: eating invertebrates
 Keratophagy or Ceratophagy: eating horny material, such as wool by cloths moths, or snakes eating their own skin after ecdysis.
 Lepidophagy: eating fish scales
 Molluscivore: eating molluscs
 Mucophagy: eating mucus
 Ophiophagy: eating snakes
 Piscivore: eating fish
 Anurophagy: eating frogs
 Spongivore: eating sponges
 Teuthophagore: eating mainly squid and other cephalopods
 Vermivore: eating worms
 Zooplanktonivore: eating zooplankton
 Herbivore: the eating of plants
 Exudativore: eating plant and/or insect exudates (gum, sap, lerp, etc.)
 Gumivore: eating tree gum
 Folivore: eating leaves
 Florivore: eating flower tissue prior to seed coat formation 
 Frugivore: eating fruits
 Graminivore: eating grasses
 Granivore: eating seeds
 Nectarivore: eating nectar
 Palynivore: eating pollen
 Phytoplanktonivore: eating phytoplankton
 Xylophage: eating wood
 Omnivore: the eating of both plants, animals, fungi, bacteria etc. The term means "all-eater".
 By amount of meat in diet 
 Hypercarnivore: more than 70% meat
 Mesocarnivore: 30–70% meat
 Hypocarnivore: less than 30% meat
 Fungivore: the eating of fungus
 Bacterivore: the eating of bacteria

The eating of non-living or decaying matter:

 Coprophage: eating faeces
 Detritivore: eating decomposing material
 Geophagia: eating inorganic earth
 Osteophage: eating bones
 Saprophage: eating decaying organic matter
 Scavenger: eating carrion

There are also several unusual feeding behaviours, either normal, opportunistic, or pathological, such as:
 Cannibalism: feeding on members of the same species
 Anthropophagy: the practice of eating human flesh
 Intrauterine cannibalism
 Oophagy or Ovophagy: the embryo/foetus eats sibling eggs
 Embryophagy: the foetus eats sibling embryos
 Filial cannibalism
 Self-cannibalism: feeding on parts of one's own body (see also autophagy)
 Sexual cannibalism: cannibalism after mating
 Kleptoparasitism: stealing food from another animal
Kleptopharmacophagy: act of stealing chemical compounds for consumption
 Lignophagia: eating wood, typically a pathological condition in some domestic animals
 Paedophagy: eating young animals
 Pica: appetite for largely non-nutritive substances, e.g. clay or hair, sometimes in pregnancy or in pathological states, typically a medical or veterinary concern.
 Placentophagy: eating placenta
 Trophallaxis: eating food regurgitated by another animal
 Zoopharmacognosy: self-medication by eating plants, soils, and insects to treat and prevent disease.
An opportunistic feeder sustains itself from a number of different food sources, because the species is behaviourally sufficiently flexible.

Storage behaviours
Some animals exhibit hoarding and caching behaviours in which they store or hide food for later use.

See also
Consumer-resource systems
Dinosaur diet and feeding
List of abnormal behaviours in animals
Ingestive behaviors, the physiological behaviors of feeding

References

Notes

Ethology

af:Voeding
pt:Alimentação